Petras Kraujalis (8 July 1882 – 14 August 1933) was a Lithuanian Roman Catholic priest, editor, and publicist who was active in Vilnius Region.

Biography

Petras Kraujelis studied at Mitau Gymnasium, but was expelled for not attending the Eastern Orthodox religious service. In 1908, he graduated from the Saint Petersburg Roman Catholic Theological Academy. He was ordained as a priest in 1907.

After the graduation, he became a vicar of the Church of All Saints, Vilnius. In 1911, he was briefly reassigned as a vicar of the Church of the Visitation of the Blessed Virgin Mary, Trakai. In 1912, he returned to Vilnius and became pastor of the parish of the Church of Saint Nicholas, Vilnius as well as a professor at Vilnius Priest Seminary. In 1911–1914, he edited Lithuanian newspaper Aušra (The Dawn). 

After 1920, he edited Lietuvos kelias (The Road of Lithuania),  (The Sound of Vilnius),  (The Sound),  (The Bell of Vilnius). He also published articles in other Lithuanian newspapers and magazines.

By his initiative on 28–30 December 1922, a congress of the teachers of the primary schools of Lithuania was convened. In 1922–1933, he was the chairman of the Lithuanian Education Society Rytas. He was an active member of the Lithuanian Scientific Society, Society of Saint Casimir for the Education and Care of Young People, and Lithuanian Society for the Relief of War Sufferers. In 1930–1931, he taught Lithuanian language at Vilnius University.

Kraujalis actively resisted Polonization of the Vilnius region and closure of Lithuanian-language schools. He was several times detained by the Polish administration and imprisoned in the Vilnius' jail.

Bibliography

References

1882 births
1933 deaths
Lithuanian newspaper editors
20th-century Lithuanian educators
20th-century Lithuanian Roman Catholic priests
Burials at Saulė Cemetery